Waleska is a city in Georgia, United States.

Waleska may also refer to:

 Blanka Waleská (1910–1986), Czech actress
 Peggy Waleska (born 1980), German female rower
 Waleska Diaz (born 1986), Honduran football player

See also
 Wałęsa (disambiguation)

de:Valeska
ro:Valeska